Maarandhoo may refer to the following places in the Maldives:

 Maarandhoo (Haa Alif Atoll)
 Maarandhoo (Gaafu Alif Atoll)